Sir Wallace Nesbit Graham (15 January 1848 – 12 October 1917) was a Canadian judge. He was Chief Justice of Nova Scotia from 1915 to 1917.

Biography 
The son of David Graham and Mary Elizabeth Bigelow, Graham was educated at Acadia College (BA 1867). He was called to the Bar in 1871, was appointed a Queen's Counsel in 1881. He was standing counsel in Nova Scotia for the Government of Canada 8 years. He was appointed on the commission to revise the Statutes of Canada in 1883; and to revise the Statutes of Nova Scotia in 1898.

In 1889, he became a Judge in Equity of Supreme Court and of Court for Divorce in Nova Scotia.

References 

 http://www.biographi.ca/en/bio/graham_wallace_nesbit_14E.html
 https://www.ukwhoswho.com/view/10.1093/ww/9780199540891.001.0001/ww-9780199540884-e-197129

1848 births
1917 deaths
Judges in Nova Scotia
Acadia University alumni
Lawyers in Nova Scotia
Canadian King's Counsel
Canadian Knights Bachelor